SDIC may refer to the following:

 San Domingo Improvement Company, an entity formed to assume control of Dominican Republic railroads in its colonial period; see 
 Singapore Deposit Insurance Corporation, see 
 Sodium dichloroisocyanurate
 South Dakota Intercollegiate Conference, a former athletic conference affiliated in the National Association of Intercollegiate Athletics (NAIA)
 Spatial Data Interest Community, or Spatial Data Infrastructure Community, a community with interests in spatial data as defined by INSPIRE
 State Development & Investment Corporation, a state-owned investment holding company in China